Peddamandadi is a Mandal in Wanaparthy district, Telangana.

Institutions
 Zilla Parishad High School
Government junior college
Kasturibha Gurukula vidyalayam

Villages
The villages in Peddamandadi mandal include:

 Alwal 	
 Chinnamandadi 	
 Dhodaguntapally
 Gatlakhanapur 	
 Jagathpally 	
 Maddigatla 	
 Mangampalli
 Manigilla	
 Mojerla 	
 Pamireddipally 	
 Peddamandadi 	
 Veeraipally 	
 Veltoor

References

Mandals in Wanaparthy district